Alexander Tottington was a medieval Bishop of Norwich.

Tottington was elected on 14 September 1406 and was consecrated on 23 October 1407. He died on 28 April 1413.

Citations

References

 

Bishops of Norwich
Year of birth unknown
1413 deaths
15th-century English Roman Catholic bishops